Alair de Souza Camargo Júnior, or simply Alair (born 27 January 1982) is a Brazilian football player. He recently plays for Ehime FC in the J2 League.

Club statistics

References

External links

1982 births
Living people
Brazilian footballers
Brazilian expatriate footballers
Expatriate footballers in Japan
J1 League players
J2 League players
Shimizu S-Pulse players
Ventforet Kofu players
Ehime FC players
Kyoto Sanga FC players
Association football defenders